Richard Mwanza (5 May 1959 − 27 April 1993) was a Zambian footballer and member of the national team.  He was among those killed in the crash of the team plane in Gabon in 1993.

Career
Mwanza played club football for Kabwe Warriors F.C.

Mwanza made several appearances for the Zambia national football team and participated in the 1992 African Cup of Nations finals. He also played for Zambia at the 1988 Summer Olympics in Seoul.

References

External links

Biography at Sports-reference.com
 
 

1959 births
1993 deaths
Zambian footballers
Zambia international footballers
Footballers at the 1988 Summer Olympics
Olympic footballers of Zambia
1992 African Cup of Nations players
Association football goalkeepers
Footballers killed in the 1993 Zambia national football team plane crash
Kabwe Warriors F.C. players